Le QuecumBar is a music venue and brasserie in Battersea, London, England dedicated to Gypsy Swing and the music of Django Reinhardt.

History
The venue originally opened as The Woodman, a typical London pub, before being renamed as "The Original Woodman" due to a pub with the same name opening nearby. It features regular live music and concerts by Gypsy Swing musicians, including Fapy Lafertin. Johnny Depp visited the venue in order to study the character of Roux in the film Chocolat.

Le Q Records 
The independent record label owned by Le QuecumBar specializes in live recordings of bands that have performed at the venue. The Shadows' Hank Marvin has appeared on live recordings, and the venue's recording of 'When I Was A Boy' by Biel Ballester was featured on the soundtrack of Woody Allen's film, Vicki Cristina Barcelona.  The Angelo Debarre quartet have recorded a live album at the venue, which was released on Lejazzetal records.

References

External links
 Video of the Shadows' Hank Marvin jamming at Le QuecumBar

Music venues in London
Jazz clubs in the United Kingdom